The Dickey E-Racer, also called the Sierra Delta E-Racer, is an American homebuilt aircraft that was designed by Shirl Dickey and produced by Shirl Dickey Enterprises of Phoenix, Arizona. It was first flown in 1984. When it was available the aircraft was supplied in the form of plans for amateur construction, with some parts available to facilitate faster construction.

Design and development
The aircraft is based upon the Rutan Long-EZ. It features a cantilever mid-wing canard layout with tip rudders, a two-seats-in-side-by-side configuration enclosed cockpit under a bubble canopy, fully retractable tricycle landing gear and a single engine in pusher configuration.

The aircraft is made from E-glass. The standard engine used in the Mark 1 is the  Buick V-8 automotive conversion powerplant.

Like most canard designs the E-Racer has a long take-off and landing roll.

At one time pre-fabricated wings and canard were available to speed construction. The manufacturer estimates the construction time from the supplied plans as 2000 hours.

Operational history
By 1998 the company reported that four aircraft were flying and six by 1999.

In December 2013, 15 examples were registered in the United States with the Federal Aviation Administration.

Variants
E-Racer Mark 1
Initial version powered by a  Buick V-8 automotive conversion powerplant
E-Racer Mark 2
Later version powered by aircraft engine powerplants
King Racer
Later version with a larger cockpit

Specifications (E-Racer Mark 1)

References

External links

E-Racer
1980s United States sport aircraft
Single-engined pusher aircraft
Mid-wing aircraft
Homebuilt aircraft
Canard aircraft
Aircraft first flown in 1984